Marsa Alam (Classical Arabic ) is a town in south-eastern Egypt, located on the western shore of the Red Sea. It is currently seeing fast increasing popularity as a tourist destination and development following the opening of Marsa Alam International Airport in 2003.

Due to its crystal clear water and its white sandy beaches, it is also known as the "Egyptian Maldives".

Among the most famous beaches around Marsa Alam is the Abu Dabab beach. In Abu Dabab, turtles are a common sight. For tourists who seek to see something less typical, there is marine wildlife like crocodilefish and octopuses.

Marsa Alam is also known as the world-class kitesurfing destination and starting point for safaris. 

Marsa Alam also has some inland attractions, such as the Emerald Mines and the Temple of Seti I at Khanais.

Climate
Marsa Alam, Kosseir and Sharm el-Sheikh have the warmest night temperatures of all other Egyptian cities and resorts.
 

See also

 Red Sea Riviera
 El Gouna
 Sahl Hasheesh
 List of cities and towns in Egypt

References

External links

 On the Red Sea, as Hotels Go Up, Divers Head Down The New York Times on diving in Marsa Alam (April 8, 2007)
 Red Sea Spinner Dolphins
 The Dugong of Marsa Abu Dabbab
 Marsa Alam Guide
 Marsa Alam Dugon
 Marsa Alam airport

 

Populated places in Red Sea Governorate
Populated coastal places in Egypt
Red Sea
Resorts in Egypt
Seaside resorts in Egypt
Tourism in Egypt
Underwater diving sites in Egypt